Papyrus 100 (in the Gregory-Aland numbering), designated by siglum 𝔓100, is an early copy of the New Testament in Greek. It is a papyrus manuscript of the Epistle of James. The surviving texts of James are verses 3:13-4:4; 4:9-5:1, they are in a fragmentary condition. The manuscript has been assigned paleographically to the late 3rd century, or early 4th century.

Text 
The Greek text of the codex is a representative of the Alexandrian text-type. According to textual scholar Philip Comfort, 𝔓100 "generally concurs" with the Alexandrian witnesses, 𝔓74 א A and B.

, it has not yet been placed in any of Kurt Aland's categories of New Testament manuscripts.

 James 3:13-18
 13 – [δειξατω εκ της] καλης αν[ασ]τροφης τα ερ[γα αυτου εν πραυ]τητι σοφια[ς] 14 ει δ[ε] ζηλον [πικρον εχετε] και̣ ε̣ρειθε̣ι̣αν εν τη καρ[δια υμων μη κα]τακαυχασθε και ψεδε̣υ[σθε κατα της αλ]ηθειας 15 [ο]υκ εστ̣ι̣ν αυτη [η σοφια ανωθεν] κατ̣ερχομε̣ν̣[η] α̣λ̣λ ε̣πι̣γ̣ι[ος ψυχικη δαιμ]ο̣νιωδης 16 οπου γαρ ζη[λος και εριθεια ε]κ̣ει ακαστασια και παν [φαυλον πραγμα] 17 η̣ δ̣ε̣ ανωθεν σοφια πρω[τον μεν αγνη εστι]ν επειτα ειρηνικη επι[εικης ευπειθης] μ̣εστη ελεους κα̣ι καρ[πων αγαθων αδιακρ]ι̣τ̣[ος] κ̣α̣ι α̣νυ̣ποκρι[τος] 18 [καρπος δε δι]κ̣αι[οσυνη]ς̣ εν ειρηνη [σπειρεται τοις ποι]ουσ[ιν ει]ρ̣ηνη̣[ν]

 James 4:1-14
 1 πο̣θεν̣ [πολεμοι και ποθεν μαχαι] εν υμε̣ι̣ν ουκ [εντευθεν εκ των η]δονω̣ν υμων των̣ [στρατευομενων εν τοις] μ̣ελ̣ε̣[σι]ν υμ̣[ω]ν̣ 2 [επιθυμειτε και ουκ εχετε] φονε̣υ̣ετε και [ζηλουτε και ου δ]υ̣να[σθ]ε̣ επιτυ̣[χ]ε̣[ι]ν μα[χεσθε και πολεμ]ε̣ιτε ουκ ε̣χ̣ε̣τ̣ε δι̣α το μη [αιτεισθαι υμας] 3 α̣ιτειτε κ[αι] ο̣υ λαμβανε̣[τε διοτι κακως] αι̣[τ]ε̣ι̣τε [ινα] [εν] ταις ηδο̣[ναις υμων] [δα]π̣ανησητ̣[ε] 4 [μοιχ]α̣λιδε[ς ουκ οιδατε οτι η φιλι]α̣ τ̣ο̣υ κ̣ο̣[σμου εχθρ]α [του θυ̅ εστιν ος εαν ουν βουληθη] φ̣ιλο[ς] – 9 –

 εις π[ε]νθος μ̣ετατραπη[τω και η χαρα] εις κατηφιαν 10 ταπεινω[θητε ενωπι]ο̣ν του κυ̅ και υψωσ̣[ε]ι υμ[ας] 11 [μη καταλα]λε̣ι̣τε αλληλων αδελφο[ι ο καταλαλων] αδελ̣φο̣υ̣ η κ[ρ]εινων τ[ον αδελφον αυ]του καταλαλει ν̣ομου κα̣[ι κρινει νομον] ει δε νον κρινεις̣ ουκ ε[ι ποιητης νομου] αλλα κρ[ι]της 12 εις εστιν ν̣[ομοθετης και] κριτης ο δυναμενος̣ [σωσαι και απολε]σαι συ δε τις ει ο κρινω̣[ν τον πλησιον] 13 αγε νυν οι λεγοντες̣ ση[μερον η αυρι]ον πορευσ[ομεθα εις τηνδε την πολιν και] π̣οιησομ̣εν εκ̣[ει ε]νιαυ̣[τον και εμπο]ρευσο[με]θα κα̣[ι] [κερ]δη[σομεν] 14 [οιτινες] ουκ ε̣πι[σ]τ̣α̣σθε̣ [το της αυριον ποια] γαρ̣ ζω̣η̣ υ̣μ[ων ατμις γαρ εστε η προς] ο̣λιγ̣ον̣ φαιν̣[ομενη επειτα και αφα]ν̣ιζο̣μ̣ε̣ν̣η̣

 James 4:15-17
 15 [αντι] τ̣ο̣[υ λεγειν υμας εαν] ο̣ κς̣̅ [θε]λ̣η̣σ̣η̣ κ̣αι̣ ζησ[ομεν και ποιη]σομ̣ε̣[ν] τ̣ο̣[υτ]ο̣ η̣ εκε[ι]ν̣[ο] 16 [νυν δε καυ]χα̣σ̣θ[ε εν ταις] α̣[λ]α̣ζον[ειαις υμων πα]σα κα[υχησις] τ̣ο̣ι̣αυτ̣η̣ [πονηρα εστιν] 17 ε̣ι̣[δοτι ουν] κ̣αλον πο̣ι̣[ειν και μη ποι]ο̣υ̣[ντι αμαρτια αυτω εστιν]

 James 5:1
 1 [αγε νυν] ο̣[ι πλουσιοι κλαυσατε ολολυζοντες] –

Location 
The manuscript is currently housed at the Ashmolean Museum (P. Oxy. 4449) at Oxford.

See also 

 List of New Testament papyri
 Oxyrhynchus Papyri

References

Further reading 

 R. Hubner, The Oxyrhynchus Papyri LXV (London: 1998), pp. 24–29.

External links

Images 

 P.Oxy.LXVI 4449 from Papyrology at Oxford's "POxy: Oxyrhynchus Online" 
 𝔓100 recto James 3:13-4:4 
 𝔓100 verso James 4:9-5:1

Official registration 
 "Continuation of the Manuscript List" Institute for New Testament Textual Research, University of Münster. Retrieved April 9, 2008 

New Testament papyri
3rd-century biblical manuscripts
Early Greek manuscripts of the New Testament
Epistle of James papyri